The ventral nerve cord is a major structure of the invertebrate central nervous system. It is the functional equivalent of the vertebrate spinal cord. The ventral nerve cord coordinates neural signaling from the brain to the body and vice versa, integrating sensory input and locomotor output. Because arthropods have an open circulatory system,decapitated insects can still walk, groom, and mate - illustrating that the circuitry of the ventral nerve cord is sufficient to perform complex motor programs without brain input.

Structure 
The ventral nerve cord runs down the ventral ("belly", as opposed to back) plane of the organism. It is made of nervous tissue and is connected to the brain.

Ventral nerve cord neurons are physically organized into neuromeres that process signals for each body segment.  Anterior neuromeres control the anterior body segments, such as the forelegs, and more posterior neuromeres control the posterior body segments, such as the hind legs.  Neuromeres are connected longitudinally, anterior to posterior, by fibrous nerve tracts called connectives.  Pairs of hemisegments, corresponding to the left and right side of the ventral nerve cord, are connected horizontally by fibrous tracts called commissures.

In the small worm Meara stichopi there is a pair of dorsal nerve cords instead.

Function 
Like the vertebrate spinal cord, the function of the ventral nerve cord is to integrate and transmit nerve signals. It contains ascending and descending neurons that relay information to and from the brain, motor neurons that project into the body and synapse onto muscles, axons from sensory neurons that receive information from the body and environment, and interneurons that coordinate circuitry of all of these neurons. In addition to spiking neurons which transmit action potentials, some neural information is transmitted via non-spiking interneurons. These interneurons filter, amplify, and integrate internal and external neural signals to guide and control movement and behavior.

Evolution
Ventral nerve cords are found in some phyla of the bilaterians, particularly within the nematodes, annelids and the arthropods. Ventral nerve cords are well-studied within insects, have been described in over 300 species covering all the major orders, and have remarkable morphological diversity. Many insects have a rope-ladder-like ventral nervous cord, composed of physically separated segmental ganglia. In contrast, in Drosophila, the thoracic and abdominal neuromeres are contiguous and the whole ventral nerve cord is considered to be one ganglion. The presumed common ancestral structure is rarely observed; instead the ventral nerve cords of most insects show extensive modification as well as convergence. Modifications include shifts in neuromere positions, their fusion to form composite ganglia, and, potentially, their separation to revert to individual ganglia.  In organisms with fused neuromeres, the connectives are still there but are very reduced in length.

Development
The insect ventral nerve cord develops according to a body plan based on a segmental set of 30 paired and one unpaired neuroblasts. A neuroblast can be uniquely identified based on its position in the array, its pattern of molecular expression, and the suite of early neurons that it produces. Each neuroblast gives rise to two hemilineages: an "A" hemilineage characterized by active Notch signalling, and a "B" hemilineage characterized by an absence of active Notch signalling. Research in the fruit fly D. melanogaster suggests that all neurons of a given hemilineage release the same primary neurotransmitter.

Engrailed is a transcription factor that helps regulate the gene frazzled in order to separate neuroblasts during embryonic development. The segregation of neuroblasts is essential for the formation and development of the ventral nerve cord.

See also 
Dorsal nerve cord in chordates
 Supraesophageal ganglion, the arthropod "brain"
Nerve net in cnidaria and echinodermata phyla
Hemichordates, who have both dorsal and ventral nerve cords

References

External links 
 Comparison of spinal cord and ventral nerve cord
 Nervous system of a lobster
 Insect morphology

Annelid anatomy
Arthropod anatomy
Nematode anatomy
Invertebrate nervous system